Dayshell is an American metal band from Southern California, United States. Their debut self-titled was released on October 15, 2013. The band's second album, Nexus, was released on October 7, 2016. The band released their third album called Mr. Pain on October 29, 2019.

History

Formation, debut album and tour (2012–2014)
Dayshell came to prominence after Shayley Bourget's departure from metalcore band Of Mice & Men in 2012. Dayshell was initially a side project started with Bourget & Martinez in the beginning of 2012. On March 10, 2012, the two released a demo version of the song "Share With Me." Fans of Bourget reacted with great positivity to the song and what it meant to them. The launch of the demo created a tiny whirlwind of steam for the two. Before the group had a full line up, Martinez was contacted by phone by Sumerian Records. Former ex band member of Covette, Jordan Wooley, Bass, had joined the duo Summer 2012. The band released a video titled 'The Beginning' discussing how the band first formed.

The band signed to the label Sumerian Records with a video teaser to the release of "Share With Me" from the band's self-titled album including, three later singles from the debut. Tyler Shippy was welcomed into the band on February 27, 2014. After the release of their self-titled they embarked a tour with bands, Middle Class Rut and Chevelle and a tour in North America, and the European Tour across Europe and the UK supporting The Word Alive, I See Stars, Crown The Empire, Get Scared and Palisades.

Line-up changes, label and Nexus (2015–2018)
The band announced the departures of Shippy in February 2015 and Martinez in July 2015 on Facebook citing personal and creative differences. Despite the departure of Shippy and Martinez the band continued to tour on the All Stars Tour in May 2015 then followed by the Dance Gavin Dance 10 Year Anniversary Tour  alongside Slaves, A Lot Like Birds and Strawberry Girls in November and December 2015.

On July 5, 2016 the band left Sumerian Records and signed to Spinefarm Records to release their second album, Nexus, which was released on October 7, 2016. This news was followed by the first single from the album, "Carsick", along with the announcement that Zack Baker was the new drummer replacing Martinez. The band released the second single from the album, "Low Light", on August 12, 2016.

Mr Pain (2018–present)
Zack Baker left the band in 2018, and went on to tour with the post-hardcore outfit Slaves before becoming a permanent member of the band. Tyler Shippy came back to the band, and pursued the role of bass. Three new singles “FeelFly”, “H8WAVE” and an unofficial B-Side track "Recovering Flames" had been released as stand alone tracks. The first single from the upcoming album Mr. Pain titled "Pressure" was released on February 19, 2019, later accompanied with a music video released two days later. On March 2, it was announced that another single featuring Dropout Kings called "KOMBAT" would be released on March 19, 2019.

On May 10, 2019, Dayshell released the single, "Superhuman". On August 9, 2019 the single "Spellbound" was released from the album Mr. Pain, which was released on October 29, 2019.

Band members

Current members
 Shayley Bourget – lead vocals, guitars, keyboards (2012–present), bass (2017–present), drums, percussion (2015, 2018–present)

Former members
 Raul Martinez – drums, percussion, audio production (2012–2015)
 Jordan Wooley – bass, backing vocals (2012–2017)
 Tyler Shippy – guitar, backing vocals (2012–2015, 2018–2019), bass (2018–2019)
 Zack Baker – drums, percussion (2016–2018) 

Current touring musicians
 Jeff Dorber – drums  (2019–present)
 Gigi Zimmer – bass  (2019–present)
 Harrison Muffley – guitar (2018–present)

Former touring musicians
 Sebastian Kerravcic – guitar (2013–2016)
 Andrew Whiting – guitar (2016–2017)
 Alex Vera – bass (2017–2018)
 Mack Rubic – guitar (2017–2018)
 PJ Huesmann – drums  (2018–2019)

Timeline

Discography

Studio albums
Dayshell (2013)
Nexus (2016)
Mr. Pain (2019)

Singles

References

American post-hardcore musical groups
Metalcore musical groups from California
American musical trios
Musical groups from California
Musical groups established in 2012
2012 establishments in California